Inquisition Symphony may refer to:
 "Inquisition Symphony" (song), by Sepultura from Schizophrenia
 Inquisition Symphony (album), by Apocalyptica